The Sporting club graulhetois, or SC Graulhet, is a rugby union French club based in Graulhet (Tarn). Founded in 1910, it play in Fédérale 2, the fourth level of French rugby union.

History
Founded in 1910, played in the Pyrénées regional championship, obtaining the chance to play the third division championship in 1936 and 1948, "Excellence" (second divisions from 1949) and finally first division in 1949-50, with a lot of qualification for final stages.

It was four times semifinalist, but it never won the Bouclier de Brennus ; neither played a final, but was finalist in 1976 of the Challenge Yves du Manoir and winner of a lot of Challenge de l'Espérance.
The last time, that play in first division was in  1994-95, the last season before the reduction of first division to 20 teams.

The SCG seen a lot of his former player to play for France national rugby union team like Guy Pauthe called to play against England in 1946. Other international players that wear the red shirt of SCG was Daniel Revailler, Francis Rouzières, Guy Laporte, Henri Sanz, Fabien Pelous, Yannick Jauzion.

Palmarès 
Challenge Yves du Manoir.
 Finalist (1) : 1976
Challenge de l'Espérance : 
 Winner (7) : 1957, 1961,1965, 1966, 1994, 1995, 1999 
 Finalist (3) : 1958,1959,1967
Coupe André Moga :
 Winner (1) : 1994

Current squad

2016-17

Famous Players

Further reading 
 Graulhet, 80 ans de rugby, de Louis Montels, éd. Sporting club graulhetois, 1988

External links 
 Official website

Graulhet
Graulhet